Laguna de Castillos is an important water body in the Rocha Department of Uruguay. It is considered an important wildlife refuge and bird sanctuary.

References

Castillos
Landforms of Rocha Department
Birdwatching sites in Uruguay
Protected areas of Uruguay